Cougar Ridge is a residential neighbourhood in the southwest quadrant of Calgary, Alberta. It is located at the western edge of the city and is bounded by Paskapoo Slopes and Canada Olympic Park to the north, 69 Street W to the east, 101 Street W to the west and Old Banff Coach Road to the south.

It is represented in the Calgary City Council by the Ward 6 councillor.

Demographics

See also
List of neighbourhoods in Calgary

References

External links

Neighbourhoods in Calgary